The Trailside Center is a tourist center, museum, and community facility in Kansas City, Missouri. The center is located at the intersection of Holmes Road and East 99th Street. Items on display include exhibits of Civil War items related to the Battle of Westport as well as items related to the Santa Fe, Oregon, and California trails. The center is staffed by volunteers.  The center also serves as a meeting place for public forums, discussions, and other events.

See also
 List of museums in Missouri
 List of points of interest in Kansas City, Missouri

References

External links
 Trailside Center official website

American Civil War museums in Missouri
Museums in Kansas City, Missouri
History museums in Missouri
California Trail
Oregon Trail
Santa Fe Trail